The Avro Club Cadet was a 1930s single-engined British biplane trainer aircraft, designed and built by Avro as a development of the earlier Cadet. It was planned for private and club use and, unlike the Cadet, was fitted with folding wings.

Design and development
The Avro 638 Club Cadet was a modified version of the Avro Cadet, similarly intended for both private and club use. The Club Cadet was fitted with unstaggered wings, that could be folded to help save hangar space; the staggered biplane wings of the earlier Cadet were unsuitable to be adapted for folding. The prototype flew in May 1933, powered by an Armstrong Siddeley Genet Major radial piston engine, another 16 were built, and production finished in 1935.

A single prototype of an enclosed three-seat cabin version, the Avro 639 Cabin Cadet was built, and first flew in 1933, but did not enter production. A second three-seat version, the Avro 640 Cadet, was produced for joy-riding work, with a widened fuselage accommodating an open cockpit for two passengers side by side in front of the pilot. Nine of these were built, the first four powered by 140 hp (104 kW) Cirrus Hermes IV engines, and the remaining five powered by Genet Major engines.

Operational history
Most Club Cadets were used by flying schools, although intended for private as well as club use, the largest user being Airwork, that operated five Club Cadets. These were later re-engined with 130 hp (100 kW) de Havilland Gipsy Major engines; the air-cooled in-line inverted engines reduced drag, and gave improved fuel consumption.

Variants
Avro 638 Club Cadet
Two-seat trainer aircraft, powered by 135 hp (101 kW) Genet Major (radial) or 130 hp (100 kW) Gipsy Major I (inverted in-line) engine, 17 built.
Avro 638 Club Cadet Special
One aircraft, fitted with a 140 hp (104 kW) Cirrus Hermes IVA inverted in-line engine.
Avro 639 Cabin Cadet
Enclosed cockpit, one built.
Avro 640 Cadet
Three seat joyriding aircraft, powered by 140 hp (104 kW) Cirrus Hermes IV inverted in-line (first four aircraft) or 135 hp (101 kW) Genet Major engine, nine built.

Operators

Airwork

Specifications (Avro 638 Genet Major I)

See also

References

External links

Canadian Aviation Museum
Avro Club Cadet – British Aircraft of World War II

638
Biplanes
1930s British civil trainer aircraft
Single-engined tractor aircraft
Aircraft first flown in 1933